Chicago Revisited: Live at Joe Segal's Jazz Showcase is a live album by American jazz pianist Ahmad Jamal featuring performances recorded in Chicago in 1992 and released on the Telarc label.

Critical reception
In his review for Allmusic Scott Yanow states: "Although it had been more than 40 years since his debut recording, pianist Ahmad Jamal's playing was as viable as ever in the 1990s. Teamed up with bassist John Heard and drummer Yoron Israel for this live Telarc CD, Jamal plays a particularly inspired repertoire that includes "All the Things You Are," Clifford Brown's "Daahoud," John Handy's "Dance to the Lady" and "Be My Love" among its nine selections. Jamal's style had developed since his early days, but his basic approach was unchanged while still sounding quite fresh. This date is an excellent example of Ahmad Jamal's unique sound and highly appealing music in the '90s.".

Track listing
All compositions by Ahmad Jamal unless noted.
	
 "All the Things You Are" (Oscar Hammerstein II, Jerome Kern) – 7:37	
 "Daahoud" (Clifford Brown) – 3:57	
 "Tater Pie" (Irving Ashby, Sonny Terry) – 6:56	
 "Bellows" – 12:35	
 "Blue Gardenia" (Lester Lee, Bob Russell) – 7:57	
 "Dance to the Lady" (John Handy) – 6:15	
 "Be My Love" (Nicholas Brodszky, Sammy Cahn) – 5:20	
 "Where Are You?" (Harold Adamson, Jimmy McHugh) – 4:11	
 "Lullaby of Birdland" (George Shearing, George David Weiss) – 4:52

Personnel
Ahmad Jamal – piano
John Heard – bass
Yoron Israel  – drums

References 

Telarc International Corporation albums
Ahmad Jamal albums
Ahmad Jamal live albums
1993 live albums